Helen Conrad (born April 11 in Pasadena, California, US) is a best-selling American writer of over 55 romance novels since 1982. She has also written under the names Jena Hunt and Raye Morgan.

Biography
Helen Conrad was born in Pasadena, California, but grew up in the Netherlands, Guam, and Washington, D.C. She obtained a B.A. in English Lit.

After years of writing romantic suspense in the style of Mary Stewart and children's books in a lot of styles, finally she published her romance novels in 1982.

She married a geologist/computer scientist, and they had four sons. Now, she lives in the Los Angeles area with her husband and two of her four sons.

Bibliography

As Jena Hunt

Single Novels
Sweeter than Wine (1982)
Sweet Victory (1982)
Home for Christmas (1982)
Proud Possession (1983)
Jade Tide (1983)
Traces of Indigo (1989)

As Helen Conrad

Single Novels
Temptation's Sting (1983)
Undercover Affair (1983)
Heart of Gold (1983)
Everlasting (1984)
Native Silver (1984)
Reach for Paradise (1985)
Tears of Gold (1985)
A Stroke of Genius (1985)
Double Exposure (1986)
Diamond in the Rough (1986)
Wild Temptation (1986)
At His Command (1986)
Something Wild and Free (1986)
Wife for a Night (1987)
Tender Fury (1987)
Desperado (1988)
Chasing Dreams (1988)
Silver Linings (1989)
Stranger's Embrace (1992)
Joe's Miracle (1992)
Jake's Promise (1993)
The Reluctant Daddy (1996)

Hometown Reunion Series Multi-Author
Those Baby Blues (1996)

Omnibus
Unexpected Son / The Reluctant Daddy (2005) (with Marisa Carroll)

As Raye Morgan

Single Novels
Summer Wind (1983)
Embers of the Sun (1983)
Roses Never Fade (1986)
Too Many Babies (1990)
Baby Aboard (1991)
In a Marrying Mood (1991)
Almost a Bride (1992)
Caution: Charm at Work (1993)
The Bachelor (1993)
Wife by Contract (1998)
The Hand-picked Bride (1998)
Promoted-To Wife! (2000)
Secret Dad (2000)
The Boss's Baby Mistake (2001)
Working Overtime (2001)
A Little Moonlighting (2002)
The Boss's Pregnancy Proposal (2007)
Her Valentine Blind Date (2008)

Angeli Series
Crystal Blue Horizon (1984)
A Lucky Streak (1987)

Ames Series
Husband for Hire (1988)
Ladies' Man (1989)

Caine Family Series
Sorry, the Bride Has Escaped (1994)
Babies on the Doorstep (1994)
The Daddy Due Date (1994)
Yesterday's Outlaw (1994)

The Baby Shower Series
Instant Dad (1994)
A Gift for Baby (1994)
Baby Dreams (1996)
Babies by the Busload (1996)

Having the Boss's Baby Series Multi-Author
She's Having My Baby! (2002)

Catching the Crown Series
Jack and the Princess (2003)
Betrothed to the Prince (2003)
Royal Nights (2003)
Counterfeit Princess (2003)

Logan's Legacy Series Multi-Author
Undercover Passion (2004)

Boardroom Brides Series
The Boss, the Baby and Me (2005)
Trading Places with the Boss (2005)
The Boss's Special Delivery (2005)

The Brides Of Bella Lucia Series Multi-Author
03. The Rebel Prince (2006)

Nine to Five Series Multi-Author
The Boss's Double Trouble Twins (2007)

Royal House of Niroli Series Multi-Author
Bride By Royal Appointment (2008)

Omnibus In Collaboration
Wanted: Mother (1996) (with Annette Broadrick and Ginna Gray)
The Wedding Arrangement (2003) (with Barbara Boswell)
Small Wonders (2004) (with Candace Camp, Ann Major and Dallas Schulze)
Mail-Order Wives (2006) (with Charlotte Douglas)

External links
Raye Morgan's official website
Raye Morgan's webpage in Harlequin
Helen Conrad's webpage and Raye Morgan's webpage in Fantastic Fiction's website

1944 births
20th-century American novelists
21st-century American novelists
American romantic fiction writers
American women novelists
Living people
20th-century American women writers
21st-century American women writers